This is a list of the Chief Justices of the Supreme Court of Bombay. It was in existence from 1824 to 1862, when the Bombay High Court was founded. The role of the judges of the court was to defend, on behalf of the British Crown, the interests of the people of Bombay against the East India Company.

The Supreme Court was preceded by the Recorder's Court, established in 1798.

Recorders of Bombay

Chief Justices of the Supreme Court of Bombay

See also
List of chief justices of the Bombay High Court

Notes

Bombay Supreme Court
Bombay High Court